Ostwalds Klassiker der exakten Wissenschaften (English: Ostwald's classics of the exact sciences) is a German book series that contains important original works from all areas of natural sciences. It was founded in 1889 by the physical chemist Wilhelm Ostwald and is now published by Europa-Lehrmittel.

History 
The series was first published by Wilhelm Engelmann in Leipzig and then by Akademische Verlagsgesellschaft in Leipzig and more recently in reprints and new editions by Verlag Harri Deutsch in Frankfurt.

Ostwald's aim was to remedy the "" (Lack of knowledge of those great works on which the edifice of science rests). In 1894, the physicist Arthur von Oettingen von Ostwald took over the editing (and remained editor until 1920, when Ostwald's son, Wolfgang Ostwald, took over the task). However, Ostwald initially continued to publish the chemistry volumes until he was replaced by Richard Abegg. 195 volumes were published by 1915; then there was an interruption due to the First World War until 1919. From 1919, they were published by the Akademische Verlagsgesellschaft, which also reprinted older editions. In 1923, the two hundredth volume was published (work by Wilhelm Ostwald on catalysis). From 1938 (volume 244) to 1954 (volume 245) there was a break due to World War II. The series was then continued by the successor to the Akademische Verlagsgesellschaft in the GDR, the Akademische Verlagsgesellschaft Geest & Portig. This was from 1968 with the B. G. Teubner Verlag, who was thus co-editor of the series. The successor to the Akademische Verlagsgesellschaft in der FRG, based in Frankfurt am Main, also published a Neue Folge (new series) from 1965 (the publishing house existed until 1983), of which six titles were published (from Volume 4 in 1968 they were published by Vieweg in Braunschweig). From 1982 there were reprints of the old series before the Second World War, in West Germany by the publishing house Verlag Harri Deutsch in Frankfurt, which specialized in the publication of scientific literature from the GDR in the FRG. A total of 275 volumes were published by 1987.

Volumes by Akademische Verlagsgesellschaft after World War II 
After World War II published by Akademische Verlagsgesellschaft, Verlag Harri Deutsch and Europa-Lehrmittel (except for reprints and new editions of the old series):

 245 Carl Ramsauer: 
 246 Georg Christoph Lichtenberg: 
 247 Alexander von Humboldt: 
 248 Alexander von Humboldt: 
 249 Eduard Poeppig: 
 250 Wilhelm Ostwald: 
 251 Heinrich Hertz: 
 252 Pavel Alexandrov et al.: 
 253 Felix Klein: 
 254 Francis Crick, Robert Holley, James D. Watson: 
 255 Ejnar Hertzsprung: 
 256 Carl Friedrich Gauß: 
 257 Wilhelm Ostwald: 
 258 Ernst Chladni: 
 259 Carl Schorlemmer: 
 260 Gerhard Harig: 
 261 Leonhard Euler: 
 262 Max Volmer: 
 263 Heinrich Hertz: 
 264 Manfred von Ardenne: 
 265 Jacobus van 't Hoff: 
 266 Jaroslav Heyrovský: 
 267 Wilhelm Ostwald:  Four manuscripts from the Nachlaß
 268 Karl August Möbius: 
 269 Peter Simon Pallas: 
 270 R. Klaus Müller (ed.): 
 271 Johann Wilhelm Ritter: 
 272: Friedlieb Ferdinand Runge, Raphael Eduard Liesegang, Boris Pavlovich Belousov, Anatol Markovich Zhabotinsky: 
 273 Johannes Kepler: 
 274 , Ernst Mohr: 
 275 Matthias Jacob Schleiden, Theodor Schwann, Max Schultze: 
 276 Ernst Abbe: 
 277–279 Jean-Baptiste de Lamarck:  1–3
 280 Franz Xaver Zach: 
 281 Manfred Eigen: 
 282
 283 Joseph von Gerlach: 
 284 Marie Curie: 
 285 Sigmund Exner: 
 286 Ludwig Boltzmann: 
 287 Alexander Alexandrowitsch Friedmann: 
 288 William Herschel: 
 289 Frederick Soddy: 
 290 Walther Nernst: 
 291 Karl Friedrich Zöllner: 
 292–294 Michael Faraday: , 3 volumes
 295 Johannes Kepler: 
 296 Robert Bunsen: 
 297 Charles Bonnet: 
 298 Paul Drude: 
 299 Max Planck: 
 300 Nikolaus Kopernikus: 
 301/302 Pierre-Simon Laplace:  1, 2
 303 Paul Emil Flechsig, Hans Berger: 
 304 Georges Lemaître:

Volumes by Akademische Verlagsgesellschaft, Frankfurt 
Only six volumes were published by Akademische Verlagsgesellschaft, Frankfurt, which, as a new series, did not follow the old series in terms of numbering:
 Volume 1, Simon Stevin: 
 Volume 2, Johann Wilhelm Ritter: 
 Volume 3, Niels Stensen: 
 Volume 4,  (The Nine Chapters on the Mathematical Art)
 Volume 5, Wilhelm Weber, Rudolf Kohlrausch: 
 Volume 6, Gregor Mendel:  (already published in the old series)

More volumes were planned (such as François Viète's  (Introduction to Algebra), which was published elsewhere in 1973).

Notes

Further reading 
  (NB. On the history of the series.)

External links 

 Page on the series at the TU Hamburg/Harburg
 Page at Verlag Europa-Lehrmittel
 First series in der Deutsche Nationalbibliothek

Series of books
1889 establishments